The Rosalinde and Arthur Gilbert Collection is a collection of objets d'art formed by the English-born businessman Sir Arthur Gilbert, who made most of his fortune in the property business in California. After initially becoming interested in silver, he assembled a large collection of decorative arts, which he gave the British nation in 1996. It now has a permanent home in the Victoria and Albert Museum in London.

The V&A describes the objects as: "many in precious materials, and often on a small scale. It is famous for European and British masterpieces including gold and silver, gold boxes, painted enamels and mosaics",these last mostly micromosaics.

History
For decades, the collection was on display at the Los Angeles County Museum of Art (LACMA), and Gilbert had promised eventually to make it a permanent gift. However, he decided to give the collection to his native country, after a dispute with LACMA regarding the collection's placement and display.

In 2000, it went on public display as "The Gilbert Collection" in a suite of seventeen galleries at Somerset House in London, the audio guide narrated by the actor Tony Clarkin. Formerly Private Curator to the Gilbert Collection, Jeanette Hanisee Gabriel was appointed "Honorary Curator of the Gilbert Collection" by the Gilbert Collection Trust in June 2001.

The exhibition was fitted out under the supervision of the silver expert Timothy Schroder, and it continued until 27 January 2008. The space then became the Embankment Galleries, an exhibition space for contemporary art. Meanwhile, the collection was incorporated into the Victoria and Albert Museum, where a new display in rooms 70–73 opened on 30 June 2009.

In early 2011, fifty objects from the collection were returned, by the provisions of a long-term loan, to LACMA.

References

External links
 The Rosalinde and Arthur Gilbert Collection – official page on the V&A website

Collections of the Victoria and Albert Museum
Former private collections in the United Kingdom
Former private collections in the United States
Decorative arts museums in England
Hardstone carving
Defunct museums in London
2008 disestablishments in England
Los Angeles County Museum of Art